The House of Eltz was a noted German noble family of the Uradel. The Rhenish dynasty has had close ties to the Kingdom of Croatia-Slavonia since 1736.

History
Though older sources mentioned one Eberhard zu Eltz, a Frankish citizen of Trier in the late 7th century, the otherwise first recorded instance of the name occurred in 1157, when Rudolph zu Eltz was mentioned as witness to the donation of a property deed by Emperor Fredrick Barbarossa. At that time, Eltz lived in a small manor on the banks of the River Elz, a tributary of the Moselle, in what is now the German state of Rhineland-Palatinate. The family members had been ministeriales and loyal supporters of the Imperial Hohenstaufen dynasty. In the early 14th century they inherited the Vogtei over Rübenach near Koblenz, a possession of Imperial Abbey of St Maximin at Trier. Eltz Castle was built in the early 12th century on a site that held a 9th-century manor house with a simple earthwork palisade. Before 1268 three brothers shared the ownership of the castle and it was kept jointly by their descendants, the Kempenich, Rodendorf and Rübenach branches until 1815 when it was taken over by the Kempenich branch, which still owns it today.

From 1331 until 1336 the Eltz were stuck in a fierce feud with mighty Baldwin of Luxembourg, then Elector and Prince-Archbishop of Trier enforcing his acknowledgement as their suzerain, whereafter the Eltz family remained vassals of the Trier archbishops. In 1324 Pope John XXII had appointed Canon Arnold von Eltz Prince-Bishop of Cammin in Pomerania against the resistance of King Louis IV. Robin von Eltz served as Master of the Livonian Order from 1385 until 1389. Canon Jakob zu Eltz was elected Prince-Archbishop of Trier in 1567; he was one of the strongest champions of the Counter-Reformation and allied himself with the Jesuits in opposing Lutheran and Calvinist influence in the region.

In 1624, Hans Jakob zu Eltz was given the hereditary office of Field Marshal for the Electorate of Trier. This made him the supreme military commander of the region in time of war, including leader of the vassals on this important region of the Holy Roman Empire. The Eltz family, Imperial Knights since 1729, reached their greatest influence with Philipp Karl von Eltz-Kempenich, from 1732 Prince Elector and Archbishop of Mainz and German Archchancellor, making him the most noble and one of the most powerful Catholic princes north of the Alps. As a result of their service throughout the troubles of the Reformation and during the wars against the Ottoman Empire, the elder line of Eltz were awarded the title of Reichsgrafen (Counts of the Empire) by the Habsburg Emperor Charles VI in 1733 in Vienna. The additional "Great Palatinate" privilege entitled the Eltz lords to knight others in the name of the Emperor, select notaries public, legitimate illegitimate children, confer coats of arms and crests, appoint judges and clerks, and release serfs from service.

In 1736 Archbishop Philipp Karl von Eltz had acquired the Lordship of Vukovar in eastern Slavonia (present-day Croatia) affiliated with the Hungarian nobility. From 1749 onwards his heirs had Eltz Manor erected, the main residence of the Grafen von und zu Eltz until the family was expelled by the Yugoslav communist regime in 1945. After Croatia declared independence from Yugoslavia, Jakob Eltz returned to Croatia and as a naturalized citizen became a member of the new Sabor parliament, where he represented Vukovar. During the Battle of Vukovar, the Eltz Manor in Vukovar was destroyed by intense shelling and the bodies in the Eltz tomb desecrated by Serbian forces. Jakob Eltz, then in his 70s, personally took part in the defence of the city.

Notable members

Paul Freiherr von Eltz-Rübenach (1875-1943), Reich Minister of Mail and Transport from 1932 until 1937

See also
 Eltz Castle
 Eltz Manor

Notes

References
Eltz Castle
 de Fabianis, Valeria, ed. (2013). Castles of the World. New York: Metro Books. 

Counter-Reformation
German noble families
Croatian nobility
Croatian noble families
History of Vukovar
Eltz